DWVM (103.9 FM), broadcasting as Spirit FM 103.9, is a radio station owned and operated by the Roman Catholic Diocese of Lucena. The station's studio and transmitter are located at the Centro Pastoral Bldg., Diocesan Compound, Brgy. Isabang, Lucena.

References

Radio stations in Lucena, Philippines
Radio stations established in 1992
1992 establishments in the Philippines